Matrix metalloproteinase-26 also known as matrilysin-2 and endometase is an enzyme that in humans is encoded by the MMP26 gene.

Function 

Proteins of the matrix metalloproteinase (MMP) family are involved in the breakdown of extracellular matrix in normal physiological processes, such as embryonic development, reproduction, and tissue remodeling, as well as in disease processes, such as arthritis and metastasis. Most MMP's are secreted as inactive proproteins which are activated when cleaved by extracellular proteinases. The encoded protein degrades type IV collagen, fibronectin, fibrinogen, casein, vitronectin, alpha 1-antitrypsin (A1AT), alpha 2-macroglobulin (A2M), and insulin-like growth factor-binding protein 1 (IGFBP), and activates MMP9 by cleavage. The protein differs from most MMP family members in that it lacks a conserved C-terminal protein domain.

References

Further reading

External links
 The MEROPS online database for peptidases and their inhibitors: M10.029

Matrix metalloproteinases